The Dominion Tank Police Role-Playing Game is a role-playing game published by Guardians of Order in 1999.

Description
The Dominion Tank Police Role-Playing Game is based on the Dominion: Tank Police manga, and uses the Tri-Stat System.

Publication history
The Dominion Tank Police Role-Playing Game was published by Guardians of Order in 1999.

David L. Pulver worked on a number of licensed, standalone games for Guardians of Order, including The Dominion Tank Police Role-Playing Game.

Reception

Reviews
Pyramid

References

Canadian role-playing games
Guardians of Order games
Role-playing games based on anime and manga
Role-playing games introduced in 1999
Science fiction role-playing games